Souldrop is a village and former civil parish, now in the parish of Knotting and Souldrop, in the Bedford district, in the ceremonial county of Bedfordshire, England, located near the border with Northamptonshire. Nearby places are, Sharnbrook, Podington, Odell, Melchbourne, Yelden, Knotting, and Newton Bromswold and Rushden over the border in Northamptonshire. In 1931 the parish had a population of 161. On 1 April 1934 the parish was abolished and merged with Knotting to form "Knotting and Souldrop".

The schools within the Souldrop catchment are Sharnbrook Primary and Sharnbrook Academy in Sharnbrook.

Sharnbrook Summit nature reserve is located near the village.

Notable people
 H. C. Asterley, novelist

References

External links

Villages in Bedfordshire
Former civil parishes in Bedfordshire
Borough of Bedford